Carmen Sandiego: Out of This World is a soundtrack album to the children's television game show Where in the World Is Carmen Sandiego? Five of its ten songs, as well as the spoken track "A Brief Disclaimer," were performed by the show's host, Greg Lee. Lynne Thigpen, who co-starred on the show as The Chief, also contributed a song, as did the show's house band, Rockapella. Unlike its predecessor, it was marketed to both children and adults, owing to the inclusion of rock bands XTC and They Might Be Giants.

The song "Change My World," credited to "Johnny Nexdor & His Neighbors," was actually performed by Rockapella member and album producer Sean Altman, mimicking the style of XTC. In turn, XTC's "Cherry in Your Tree" was recorded for the album after producer David Yazbek, knowing of the lead singer Andy Partridge's unreleased "bubblegum" songs, suggested they contribute one to the album. They Must Be Giants' "Why Does the Sun Shine," a cover of a 1959 song by Tom Glazer, was taken from their EP of the same name.

Track listing

Personnel

Sean Altman, David Yazbek - Producers (except "Why Does the Sun Shine?")
Billy Straus - Producer, engineer, mixer (except "Why Does the Sun Shine?"); guitar, bass guitar ("Half a World Away")
Julio Peralta, Raging Dave Robbins, Suzanne Dyer - Assistant engineers (except "Why Does the Sun Shine?")
Jed Alpert - Executive producer

3 Brave Woodsmen - Vocals ("Half a World Away")
Burl Mann
Ian Jaeger
Norm Raposbec

Rockapella - Vocals ("Big Wet Rag")
Scott Leonard - High tenor
Sean Altman - Tenor
Elliott Kerman - Baritone
Barry Carl - Bass
Jeff Thacher - Vocal percussionist

XTC ("Cherry in Your Tree")
Andy Partridge - Vocals, guitar
Colin Moulding - Vocals, bass guitar
Terry Chambers - Drums
Barry Andrews - Vocals, keyboard
Dave Gregory - Guitar

 They Might Be Giants ("Why Does the Sun Shine"?)
John Linnell - Accordion, saxophone, bass clarinet, vocals, producer
John Flansburgh - Electric guitar, vocals, producer

Critical reception
Allmusic gave the album an editor rating of 3 stars out of 5.

The Toledo Blade's Allan Detrich suggested that artists like XTC and They Might Be Giants were used to appeal to a younger demographic. He added that some of the songs have "fun lyrics and make even older listeners smile."

References

External links
 Carmen Sandiego: Out Of This World (CD) at Discogs
 Carmen Sandiego - Out Of This World at They Might Be Giants wiki

Soundtrack compilation albums